The paired (left and right) medial pulvinary veins are veins that drain blood from the corresponding halves of medial part of the pulvinar of the thalamus into the corresponding internal cerebral vein

References  

Pulvinary veins